The Calera Downtown Historic District, in Calera, Alabama, was listed on the National Register of Historic Places in 2006.

It was deemed significantfor its collection of vernacular commercial structures dating from the late-nineteenth to the mid-twentieth centuries, including good examples of one- and two-part commercial blocks, temple-front and free-standing commercial buildings. Together these structures depict the evolution of the community from its days as an early industrial town to its growth as a transportation center. They reflect the variety of opportunities available in the community, offering to meet every need of the citizenry. From banking to groceries, to dry goods, to shoe repair, to entertainment, to socialization, automobile service, and accommodation—all were available in the two-block area of the community.

It is located at the junction of U.S. Route 31 and State Route 25.

References

External links

Historic districts on the National Register of Historic Places in Alabama
National Register of Historic Places in Shelby County, Alabama